Pierre "Pierrot" Bianconi (born 16 November 1962 – disappeared 29 December 1993) is a French former professional footballer who played as a defender.

Club career 
Bianconi played for SC Bastia, RCFC Besançon, Cannes, Nîmes, and Paris Saint-Germain over the course of 11 years, making over 175 career appearances and scoring 5 goals.

As a very aggressive player, Bianconi received numerous yellow and red cards during his career. In a friendly between Nîmes and Toulouse in 1985, he slapped Alberto Márcico. The referee brandished his red card, but Bianconi thought otherwise, and decided to rip apart the card and headbutt the referee, who was left with a bloody nose. Bianconi was given a six-month ban in all competitions, and never played for Nîmes again.

International career 
On 2 September 1989, Bianconi made his debut for the Corsica national team in a 4–3 victory over Toulon.

Disappearance 
Bianconi mysteriously disappeared on 29 December 1993, at the age of 31. His car was found on the port of Bastia, but without any trace of its owner.

Career statistics

See also
List of people who disappeared

Notes

References

External links 
 

1962 births
1990s missing person cases
Association football defenders
Footballers from Corsica
French footballers
Sportspeople from Bastia
Ligue 1 players
Ligue 2 players
Missing people
Missing person cases in France
INF Vichy players
Nîmes Olympique players
AS Cannes players
Paris Saint-Germain F.C. players
Racing Besançon players
SC Bastia players